Max Yoho (1934 - April 22, 2017) began writing humorous books and poetry in 1988 after becoming a widower.  Max has written several books including The Revival and Tales from Comanche County.

Biography

Max Yoho was born in Colony, Kansas in 1934.  In 1944 Max moved with his family to Atchison, Kansas and in 1949 to Topeka, Kansas.  He graduated from Topeka High School in 1953.  Following graduation, he enrolled at Washburn University where his writing talents were identified.  He wrote for The Review, a student newspaper.

Max was married to his high school sweetheart, Rosemary Carter, in 1953 and they had three sons: Alex, Stuart and Nicholas. Max worked as a machinist for 38 years, including 31.5 years at the Goodyear Tire & Rubber plant in Topeka.

Yoho began to focus on writing after he became a widower in 1988. Focusing on poetry, essays and short-short stories, much of Yoho's early work was published in Inscape, the literary journal produced by Washburn University in the late 1980s and early 1990s. He retired as a machinist in April, 1992, and focused seriously on his writing career.

Max died in April, 2017, after suffering from kidney failure. He is survived by his second wife, Carol, and three sons: Alex (Sherry) Yoho, Stuart (Anna) Yoho, and Nick Yoho. Max's first wife, Rosemary, had died in 1988. At the time of his passing he also had five grandchildren and six great grandchildren.

Published Work

He published his first humorous novel, The Revival, in 2001 and won the 2002 "J. Donald Coffin Memorial Book Award" of the Kansas Authors Club. He is the only Kansas author to have two titles, The Moon Butter Route (published in 2006) and The Revival in the Kansas Center for the Book's "Favorite Kansas Books" list. Other books from this list include Truman Capote's In Cold Blood, Robert Day's The Last Cattle Drive, and L. Frank Baum's The Wonderful Wizard of Oz.

Tales from Comanche County: The Peculiar Education of Max Freeman was published in 2002. Both The Revival and Tales from Comanche County are available as unabridged audio books from Books In Motion of Spokane, Washington.

Felicia, These Fish Are Delicious, a collection of Yoho's poems, essays and short stories, was published in 2004.

Max's third novel, The Moon Butter Route, was named a "Kansas Notable Book" by the Kansas State Librarian in 2006 and received the 2007 "J. Donald Coffin Memorial Book Award" of the Kansas Authors Club.

His poem "Vacant Lot" was published in The Midwest Quarterly of Pittsburg State University in Summer, 2007 (Volume XIVIII, No. 4). His short story "The Passing of the Old Snookertorium" was published in The Little Balkans Review, a Southeast Kansas literary & graphics journal, in Fall, 2009 (Vol. 5, No. 4), and was nominated by the editors for a Pushcart Prize in 2009.

Max's novel With the Wisdom of Owls was published in Fall, 2010. About a baby with an owl as his godfather, the work is another strong example of this author's delight with the English language. The book is based on the author's credo: "Never let reality limit your life."

Max's newest novel Me and Aunt Izzy: Doing Time at the Jesse James Hideout and Coal Mining Company was published in Fall, 2011. Set in fictitious "Buffalo County," Southeast Kansas, in 1938, this is the delightful story of eleven-year-old Jefferson Davis Johnson, sentenced to a summer of "moral rehabilitation" under the watchful eye of his great aunt, Queen Isabella of Spain Johnson. A relic of the "roaring twenties," this stern matriarch may have her own ideas about what a boy should learn.

Max was awarded one of eleven "ARTY" Awards by ArtsConnect of NE Kansas on May 5, 2011, as "Distinguished Literary Artist." In October, 2013, Max was presented with the "Achievement Award" for his career as a writer by the Kansas Authors Club at their convention in Wichita, Kansas.

Books
 The Revival, 2001, Dancing Goat Press, 
 Tales From Comanche County, 2002, Dancing Goat Press,  (Second edition is recently available)
 Felicia, These Fish Are Delicious, 2004, Dancing Goat Press, 
 The Moon Butter Route, 2006, Dancing Goat Press, 
 With the Wisdom of Owls, 2010, Dancing Goat Press, 
 Me and Aunt Izzy, 2011, Dancing Goat Press,

External links
 Yoho's author's page on Map of Kansas Literature
 Video review of Max Yoho, Author"
 Interview with Max Yoho
 "The Man Who Conquered Reality"
 "Max's Fire"
 Yoho's Facebook author's page
 Max Yoho's obituary
 "Max Yoho, Topeka Author, remembered for his creativity, zest for life"

People from Anderson County, Kansas
Writers from Topeka, Kansas
People from Atchison, Kansas
2017 deaths
1934 births
21st-century American novelists
American male novelists
21st-century American male writers